Bryan C. Faundo (born February 18, 1984) is a Filipino professional basketball player for the Boracay Islanders of the Pilipinas Super League.

College career
In the NCAA, he was one of the key players for the Letran Knights that helped the team win the 2005-06 Championship. While in Letran, Faundo was also teammates with future PBA players RJ Jazul and Rey Guevarra. Together, they led the Knights to another finals appearance in 2007, but lost to rivals San Beda Red Lions.

Professional career
Faundo was not drafted in 2009. He was signed by Barako Energy Coffee Masters. As a rookie, he played sparingly in 20 games. He averaged 1.9 points, 2.1 rebounds and 0.2 assists in 10.3 minutes.

On 2010, Faundo was signed by ASEAN Basketball League club Brunei Barracudas as an import for the 2010–11 ABL season.

He was signed by the Meralco Bolts to a six-month contract.

On November 2012, Faundo was signed by Petron Blaze Boosters. He was traded to Barangay Ginebra for Eric Menk.

Faundo was picked by expansion team Blackwater Elite ninth overall in the 2014 PBA Expansion Draft. With the Elite, he had his best season in the professional ranks, averaging career-highs in minutes (25.0 minutes per game), points (9.6 points per game), and rebounds (5.8 rebounds per game) and was one of the top five centers in the 2014–15 season based on player efficiency rating.

Faundo was signed by the Meralco Bolts from Blackwater after his contract expired, marking his return to the team since playing for them from 2011 to 2012.

PBA career statistics

As of the end of 2021 season

Season-by-season averages

|-
| align=left | 
| align=left | Barako Energy
| 20 || 10.4 || .373 || .000 || .250 || 2.2 || .3 || .0 || .3 || 2.0
|-
| align=left | 
| align=left | Meralco / Air21
| 16 || 8.6 || .436 || — || .333 || 1.3 || .1 || .1 || .3 || 2.2
|-
| align=left | 
| align=left | Petron / GlobalPort
| 14 || 11.8 || .425 || — || .846 || 2.6 || .3 || .4 || .1 || 3.2
|-
| align=left | 
| align=left | Barangay Ginebra
| 6 || 2.3 || .500 || — || — || 1.5 || .0 || .0 || .0 || 1.0
|-
| align=left | 
| align=left | Blackwater
| 27 || 25.0 || .486 || .000 || .810 || 5.8 || .9 || .1 || .1 || 9.6
|-
| align=left | 
| align="left" rowspan="5" | Meralco
| 50 || 13.2 || .458 || — || .875 || 2.4 || .7 || .0 || .1 || 4.6
|-
| align=left | 
| 26 || 6.4 || .429 || .000 || .500 || 1.3 || .1 || .0 || .1 || 1.7
|-
| align=left | 
| 18 || 8.2 || .400 || .500 || .000 || 1.7 || .3 || .2 || .1 || 2.5
|-
| align=left | 
| 37 || 10.1 || .434 || .250 || .429 || 1.7 || .3 || .1 || .2 || 3.2
|-
| align=left | 
| 10 || 10.1 || .333 || .000 || .000 || 2.5 || .5 || .0 || .2 || 2.4
|-
| align=left | 
| align=left | Phoenix / Alaska
| 11 || 8.3 || .478 || .000 || .400 || 2.1 || .3 || .0 || .1 || 2.2
|-class=sortbottom
| align=center colspan=2 | Career
| 235 || 11.6 || .446 || .167 || .704 || 2.4 || .4 || .1 || .2 || 3.7

References

External links
Player Profile at PBA-Online!

1984 births
Living people
Alaska Aces (PBA) players
Air21 Express players
ASEAN Basketball League players
Barako Bull Energy Boosters players
Barangay Ginebra San Miguel players
Basketball players from Pangasinan
Blackwater Bossing players
Centers (basketball)
Filipino expatriate basketball people in Brunei
Filipino men's basketball players
Letran Knights basketball players
Maharlika Pilipinas Basketball League players
Meralco Bolts players
Phoenix Super LPG Fuel Masters players
Power forwards (basketball)
San Miguel Beermen players